Antoine Abate (born 22 August 1938) is an Italian racing cyclist. He rode in the 1961 Tour de France.

References

External links
 

1938 births
Living people
Italian male cyclists
Cyclists from Campania
Sportspeople from the Province of Avellino
20th-century Italian people